The Dunedin City Council is the local government authority for Dunedin in New Zealand. It is a territorial authority elected to represent the  people of Dunedin. Since October 2022, the Mayor of Dunedin is Jules Radich, who succeeded Aaron Hawkins. The council consists of a mayor who is elected at large, and 14 councillors elected at large, one of whom gets chosen as deputy-mayor. The councillors are elected under the Single Transferable Vote (STV) system in triennial elections, with the most recent election held on 8 October 2022.

2022–present
The current composition of the council is as follows:

2019–2022
During the 2019–2022 term the composition of the Council was as follow:

2016–2019
During the 2016–2019 term the composition of the Council was as follows:

2013–2016

During the 2013–2016 term, the composition of the Council was as follows:

2010–2013
During the 2010–2013 term, the composition of the Council was as follows:

References

External links 

Politics of Dunedin
City councils in New Zealand
Year of establishment missing